Bor-Kosobulat is a rural locality (a selo) in Shadrukhinsky Selsoviet, Uglovsky District, Altai Krai, Russia. The population was 87 as of 2013. It was founded in 1884. There are 2 streets.

Geography 
Bor-Kosobulat is located 31 km northwest of Uglovskoye (the district's administrative centre) by road. Pavlovka is the nearest rural locality.

References 

Rural localities in Uglovsky District, Altai Krai